Kara Milling (born September 22, 1976) is a retired American female volleyball player. She was part of the United States women's national volleyball team at the 1998 FIVB Volleyball Women's World Championship in Japan.

References

External links
http://dailybruin.com/1998/06/14/kara-milling/
http://articles.latimes.com/1994-11-16/sports/sp-63222_1_coach-andy-banachowski
http://articles.latimes.com/1993-11-28/sports/sp-61693_1_newport-harbor

1976 births
Living people
American women's volleyball players
Place of birth missing (living people)
21st-century American women
UCLA Bruins women's volleyball players